Baileys Irish Cream is an Irish cream liqueur, an alcoholic drink flavoured with cream, cocoa and Irish whiskey. It is made by Diageo at Nangor Road, in Dublin, Ireland and in Mallusk, Northern Ireland. It is the original Irish cream, invented by a team headed by Tom Jago in 1971 for Gilbeys of Ireland; Diageo currently owns the trademark. It has a declared alcohol content of 17% by volume.

History and origin
Baileys Irish Cream was created by Tom Jago of Gilbeys of Ireland, a division of International Distillers & Vintners, as Gilbeys searched for something to introduce to the international market. The process of finding a product began in 1971, and production research began in earnest after consultants David Gluckman, Hugh Seymour-Davies and Mac Macpherson came up with an alcoholic drink made of Irish whiskey and cream that, they remarked, "didn't taste punishing".

The formulation of Baileys was motivated partly by the availability of alcohol from a money-losing distillery (part of International Distillers & Vintners, and probably W&A Gilbey) and a desire to use surplus cream from another business, Express Dairies, owned by Grand Metropolitan, resulting from the increased popularity of semi-skimmed milk.  It included alcohol, cream and the chocolate milk-based drink powder Nesquik produced by Nestle; the initial formulation process took approximately 45 minutes.

Baileys was introduced in 1974 as the first Irish cream on the market. The name is that of a restaurant owned by John Chesterman, who granted W&A Gilbey permission to use it. The fictional R.A. Bailey signature was inspired by The Bailey's Hotel in London, though the registered trademark omits the apostrophe.

Manufacture
Cream and Irish whiskey from various distilleries are homogenised to form an emulsion with the aid of an emulsifier containing refined vegetable oil. The process prevents the separation of alcohol and cream during storage. Baileys contains a proprietary cocoa extract recipe giving Baileys its chocolate character and essence. The number of other ingredients is not known, but they include herbs and sugar.

According to the manufacturer, no preservatives are required as the alcohol content preserves the cream. The cream used in the drink comes from Tirlán, an Irish dairy company. Tirlán's Virginia facility in County Cavan produces a range of fat-filled milk powders and fresh cream. It has been the principal cream supplier to Baileys Irish Cream Liqueurs for more than 30 years. At busier times of the year, Tirlán also supplies cream from its Ballyragget facility in Kilkenny.
Baileys bottles are manufactured solely at Encirc Glass Plant in Derrylin, Co. Fermanagh.

Shelf life

Nutritional values

Drinking
As with milk, cream will curdle whenever it comes into contact with a weak acid. Milk and cream contain casein, which coagulates when mixed with weak acids such as lemon, tonic water, or traces of wine. While this outcome is undesirable in most situations, some cocktails (such as the cement mixer, which consists of a shot of Baileys mixed with the squeezed juice from a slice of lime) specifically encourage coagulation.

Variant flavours
In 2003, Bailey & Co. launched Baileys Glide, aimed at the alcopop market. It was discontinued in 2006.

In 2005, Baileys launched mint chocolate and crème caramel variants at 17% ABV. They were originally released in UK airports and were subsequently released in the mass markets of the UK, US, Australia and Canada in 2006.

In 2008, Baileys, after the success of previous flavour variants, released a coffee variant, followed by a hazelnut-flavoured variant in 2010. The company trialled a new premium variety, Baileys Gold, at several European airports in 2009. The Gold version also was marketed towards the Japanese consumer. 2011, Baileys launched a Biscotti flavour, and a sub-brand premium product Baileys Chocolat Luxe, which combined Belgian chocolate with Baileys, in 2013. The company released a Vanilla-Cinnamon variety in the US market in 2013, with further flavours, Pumpkin Spice, Espresso and Salted Caramel launching the following year.

From 2016 to 2018, Baileys Coffee Mocha and Latte was available in cans across the UK and Europe. In 2017, Baileys launched their Pumpkin Spice flavoured liqueur, as well as their vegan-friendly Baileys Almande, described as a blend of "sweet almond oil, cane sugar and a touch of real vanilla". In 2018, Baileys Strawberries & Cream was made available. Baileys launched a new flavour, Red Velvet Cupcake late 2019. In 2020, Baileys Apple Pie Flavour was launched for Christmas.

See also

Irish cream
Irish coffee

References

External links

 
 Account of the invention of Baileys

Cream liqueurs
Diageo brands
Irish brands
Irish alcoholic drinks
Irish liqueurs
Products introduced in 1974